Mr. Black was an Australian television comedy series which premiered on Network Ten on 7 May 2019.

Plot
Mr. Black follows the story of a former journalist whose failing health requires him to move in with his daughter Angela and her boyfriend Fin.

Cast
 Stephen Curry as Mr. Peter Black
 Nadine Garner as Rowena Black
 Sophie Wright as Angela Geraldine Black
 Nick Russell as Fin Cruickshank 
 Paul Denny as Malcolm

Episodes

Ratings

References

External links 
 
 

2019 Australian television series debuts
2019 Australian television series endings
Network 10 original programming
Australian comedy television series